Mary Hopkins may refer to:

 Mary Ellen Hopkins (1932–2013), American quilter
 Mary Rice Hopkins, Christian children's musician
 Mary Alden Hopkins, American journalist, essayist, and activist

See also
 Mary Hopkin (born 1950), Welsh folk singer best known for singing "Those Were the Days"